This is an alphabetical listing of notable mosques in Canada (Arabic: Masjid, French: Mosquée), including Islamic places of worship that do not qualify as traditional mosques.

Notable individual mosques

See also

Islam in Canada
Lists of mosques
List of mosques in Ottawa
List of mosques in the United States
List of mosques in the Americas
List of mosques in Mexico

References

 
Canada
Mosques